The Yellow Sisters are a Czech female vocal quartet, known for singing a cappella. Its members are Antonia Tereza Nyass, Barbora Vaculíková, Lucie Hawa Goldin and Léňa Yellow – Lenka Jankovská. Their singing is inspired by many musical styles and regions (from African traditional to American gospel, reggae, jazz or funk). They call themselves "sound illusionists" and their repertoire is purely self-composed.
Their sound is quite experimental and playful, based on the rhythms of the Czech language.

They are known for their strong support for human rights.

They have been performing since 2005 – their first demo CD was produced in that year.

Members 
 Antonia Tereza Nyass
 Barbora Vaculíková
 Lucie Hawa Goldin
 Léňa Yellow – Lenka Jankovská

Discography 
 CD Demo Yellow Sisters 2005
 CD Singalana, Indies Records, 2006
 DVD Yellow Sisters Live at Retro Music Hall, Prague
 Tubab Woman – single, 2009
 CD Tubab Woman, Indies Scope, 2010
 CD Zvěřinec (Menagerie), Indies Scope, 2012
 CD 2013 REMIXED, 2013
 CD Yellow Sisters LIVE & Petr Wajsar (Club Kino Černošice), 2014
 CD Zvěřinec 2, Indies Scope, 2017
 Diva – single, 2018

Links 

 Official homepage
 Indies records portal
 Musicserver.cz
 FreeMusic – Polí5

Vocal quartets
Czech musical groups
A cappella musical groups